Mick Evans (born 22 July 1947) is a former  Australian rules footballer who played with North Melbourne in the Victorian Football League (VFL).

Notes

External links 

Living people
1947 births
Australian rules footballers from Victoria (Australia)
North Melbourne Football Club players